Oana Negrea (born 28 September 2000) is a Romanian footballer who plays as a midfielder and has appeared for the Romania women's national team.

Career
Negrea has been capped for the Romania national team, appearing for the team during the 2019 FIFA Women's World Cup qualifying cycle.

References

External links
 
 
 

2000 births
Living people
Romanian women's footballers
Romania women's international footballers
Women's association football midfielders
FCU Olimpia Cluj players